USS Sagamore is a name used more than once by the U.S. Navy:

 , a gunboat operating during the American Civil War.
 , a steel, oceangoing tug commissioned on 18 June 1918.
 , launched on 17 January 1945; and commissioned on 19 March 1945.

United States Navy ship names